The Qara Khitai, or Kara Khitai ( or ), also known as the Western Liao, officially the Great Liao, was a dynastic regime based in Central Asia ruled by the Khitan Yelü clan. They were culturally Sinicized to a large extent, especially among the elites, being refugees from the Liao dynasty. Chinese and Muslim historiographical sources, such as the History of Liao, considered the Qara Khitai to be a Chinese dynasty. 

The dynasty was founded by Yelü Dashi (Emperor Dezong), who led the remnants of the Liao dynasty from Manchuria to Central Asia after fleeing from the Jurchen-led Jin dynasty conquest of northern China. The empire was usurped by the Naimans under Kuchlug in 1211; traditional Chinese, Persian, and Arab sources consider the usurpation to be the end of the dynasty, even though the empire would not fall until the Mongol conquest in 1218. Some remnants of the Qara Khitai would form the Qutlugh-Khanid dynasty in southern Iran.

The territories of the Qara Khitai corresponded to parts of modern-day China, Kazakhstan, Kyrgyzstan, Mongolia, Tajikistan, and Uzbekistan. The Anushtegin dynasty, the Karluks, Qocho, the Kankalis, and the Kara-Khanid Khanate were vassal states of the Qara Khitai at some point in history.

Names 

The Qara Khitai took on trappings of a Chinese state and inherited the dynastic name "Great Liao". Hence, Chinese, Korean, Japanese and Vietnamese historians generally refer to the empire as the "Western Liao", emphasizing its continuation from the Liao dynasty.

The name "Qara Khitai", commonly used by Central Asian tribes to refer to the dynasty, is also commonly used in Western scholarly works. The term is often translated as the Black Khitans in Mongolian, but its original meaning is unclear today. In Modern Mongolian, "Kara-Khitan" is rendered "Хар Хятан" (Khar Khyatan). Since no direct records from the empire survive today, the only surviving historical records about the empire come from foreign sources.

Black Khitans (黑契丹) has also been seen used in Chinese. "Qara," which literally means "black," corresponds with the Liao's dynastic color black and its dynastic element Water, according to the theory of Five Elements (wuxing). The Jurchens referred to the empire as Dashi or Dashi Linya (after its founder), to reduce any claims the empire may have had to the old territories of the Liao dynasty. Muslim historians initially referred to the state simply as Khitay or Khitai; they may have adopted this form of "Khitan" via the Uyghurs of Kocho in whose language the final -n or -ń became -y. Only after the Mongol conquest did the state begin to be referred to in the Muslim world as the Kara-Khitai or Qara-Khitai. Khitan is the origin of "Cathay", a foreign name for China.

History

Founding of the Qara Khitai 

The Qara Khitai empire was established by Yelü Dashi, who led nomadic Khitans west by way of Mongolia after the collapse of the Liao dynasty. The Jurchens, once vassals of the Khitans, had allied with the Song dynasty and overthrown the Liao. Yelü recruited Khitans and other tribes to form an army, and in 1134 captured Balasagun from the Kara-Khanid Khanate, which marks the start of the Qara Khitai empire in Central Asia. The Khitan forces were soon joined by 10,000 Khitans, who had been subjects of the Kara-Khanid Khanate. The Khitans then conquered Kashgar, Khotan, and Beshbalik. The Khitans defeated the Western Kara-Khanid Khanate at Khujand in 1137, eventually leading to their control over the Fergana Valley. They won the Battle of Qatwan against the Western Kara-Khanids and the Seljuk Empire on September 9, 1141, which allowed the Khitans to gain control over Transoxiana.

Yelü Dashi had originally hoped to recapture northern China from the Jin dynasty and restore the territories once held by the Liao dynasty. However, he soon discovered the relative weakness of his empire vis-a-vis the Jin dynasty and gave up the idea after a disastrous attack on the Jin dynasty in 1134. The Western Liao continued to defy Jin supremacy in 1146, and continued sending scouts and small military units against the Jin in 1156, 1177, 1185, 1188. This indicates that for the first 2 generations there remained considerable interest in reconquest.

Yelü Dashi's successors 

When Yelü Dashi died his wife, Xiao Tabuyan (1143-1150) became regent for their son. The son, Yelü Yilie, ruled from 1150 to 1163, to be succeeded by his sister, Yelü Pusuwan (1164-1177). She then fell in love with her husband's younger brother, Xiao Fuguzhi. They were executed in 1177 by her husband's father, Xiao Wolila, who then placed his son Yelü Zhilugu (1178–1211) on the throne. The empire was weakened by rebellions and internal wars among its vassals, especially during the latter parts of its history.

During this period the empire contracted in the northeast when in 1175 the Naimans east of the Altai and the Qangli north of Lake Balkhash made a partial submission to the Jurchens. In the west there were many conflicts with Khwarezm involving non-payment of tribute and rival claimants to the throne. Late in the period it expanded far to the south as the Khwarezmian Empire until it was conquered by the Mongols in 1220, two years after the Qara Kitai. In the south the Kara-Khanid vassals were lightly held and engaged in various conflicts with each other, the Qara Kitai, Khwarezm and the Gurids.

Kuchlug's usurpation and end of the Khanate 

In 1208, a Naiman prince, Kuchlug, fled his homeland after being defeated by Mongols. Kuchlug was welcomed into the empire of the Qara-Khitans, and was allowed to marry Zhilugu's daughter. However, in 1211, Kuchlug revolted, and later captured Yelü Zhilugu while the latter was hunting.  Zhilugu was allowed to remain as the nominal ruler but died two years later, and many historians regarded his death as the end of the Qara-Khitan empire. In 1216, Genghis Khan dispatched his general Jebe to pursue Kuchlug; Kuchlug fled, but in 1218, he was finally captured and decapitated. The Mongols fully conquered the former territories of the Qara-Khitans in 1220.

Aftermath 

The Qara Khitais became absorbed into the Mongol Empire; a segment of the Qara-Khitan troops had previously already joined the Mongol army fighting against Kuchlug.  Another segment of the Qara-Khitans, in a dynasty founded by Buraq Hajib, survived in Kirman as a vassal of the Mongols, but ceased to exist as an entity during the reign of Öljaitü of the Ilkhanate. The Qara-Khitans were dispersed widely all over Eurasia as part of the Mongol army. In the 14th century, they began to lose their ethnic identity, traces of their presence however may be found as clan names or toponyms from Afghanistan to Moldova. Today a Khitay tribe still lives in northern Kyrgyzstan.

Administration 
The Khitans ruled from their capital at Balasagun (in today's Kyrgyzstan), directly controlling the central region of the empire. The rest of their empire consisted of highly autonomous vassalized states, primarily Khwarezm, the Karluks, the Kingdom of Qocho of the Uyghurs, the Kankalis, and the Western, Eastern, and Fergana Kara-Khanids. The late-arriving Naimans also became vassals, before usurping the empire under Kuchlug.

The Khitan rulers adopted many administrative elements from the Liao dynasty, including the use of Confucian administration and imperial trappings. The empire also adopted the title of Gurkhan (universal Khan). The Khitans used the Chinese calendar, maintained Chinese imperial and administrative titles, gave its emperors reign names, used Chinese-styled coins, and sent imperial seals to its vassals. Although most of its administrative titles were derived from Chinese, the empire also adopted local administrative titles, such as tayangyu (Turkic) and vizier.

The Khitans maintained their old customs, even in Central Asia. They remained nomads, adhered to their traditional dress, and maintained the religious practices followed by the Liao dynasty Khitans. The ruling elite tried to maintain the traditional marriages between the Yelü king clan and the Xiao queen clan, and were highly reluctant to allow their princesses to marry outsiders. The Qara-Khitai Khitans followed a mix of Buddhism and traditional Khitan religion, which included fire worship and tribal customs, such as the tradition of sacrificing a gray ox with a white horse. In an innovation unique to the Qara Khitai, the Khitans paid their soldiers salary.

The empire ruled over a diverse population that was quite different from its rulers. The majority of the population was sedentary, although the population suddenly became more nomadic during the end of the empire, due to the influx of Naimans. The majority of their subjects were Muslims, although a significant minority practiced Buddhism and Nestorianism. Although Chinese and Khitan were the primary languages of administration, the empire also administered in Persian and Uyghur.

Association with China 

In Chinese historiography, the Qara Khitai is most commonly called the "Western Liao" (西遼) and is considered to be an orthodox Chinese dynasty, as is the case for the Liao dynasty. The history of the Qara Khitai was included in the History of Liao (one of the Twenty-Four Histories), which was compiled officially during the Yuan dynasty by Toqto'a et al.

After the fall of the Tang dynasty, various dynasties of non-Han ethnic origins gained prestige by portraying themselves as the legitimate dynasty of China. Qara Khitai monarchs used the title of "Chinese emperor", and were also called the "Khan of Chīn". The Qara Khitai used the "image of China" to legitimize their rule to the Central Asians. The Chinese emperor, together with the rulers of the Turks, Arabs, India and the Byzantine Romans, were known to Islamic writers as the world's "five great kings". Qara Khitai kept the trappings of a Chinese state, such as Chinese coins, Chinese imperial titles, the Chinese writing system, tablets, seals, and used Chinese products like porcelain, mirrors, jade and other Chinese customs. The adherence to Liao Chinese traditions has been suggested as a reason why the Qara Khitai did not convert to Islam. Despite the Chinese trappings, there were comparatively few Han Chinese among the population of the Qara Khitai. These Han Chinese had lived in Kedun during the Liao dynasty, and in 1124 migrated with the Khitans under Yelü Dashi along with other people of Kedun, such as the Bohai, Jurchen, and Mongol tribes, as well as other Khitans in addition to the Xiao consort clan.

Qara Khitai's rule over the Muslim-majority Central Asia has the effect of reinforcing the view among some Muslim writers that Central Asia was linked to China even though the Tang dynasty had lost control of the region a few hundred years before. Marwazī wrote that Transoxania was a former part of China, while Fakhr al-Dīn Mubārak Shāh defined China as part of "Turkestan", and the cities of Balāsāghūn and Kashghar were considered part of China.

Legacy 
The association of Khitai with China meant that the most enduring trace of the Khitan's power is names that are derived from it, such as Cathay, which is the medieval Latin appellation for China. Names derived from Khitai are still current in modern usage, such as the Russian, Bulgarian, Uzbek and Mongolian names for China. However, the use of the name Khitai to mean "China" or "Chinese" by Turkic speakers within China, such as the Uyghurs, is considered pejorative by the Chinese authorities, who tried to ban it.

Seals 
 

In Autumn of the year 2019 a Chinese type bronze seal was discovered near a Caravanserai that was located near the Ustyurt Plateau. This seal has a weight of 330 grams and has the dimensions of 50x52x13 millimeters with a handle that is 21 millimeters in height. The inscription of the seal is written in Khitan large script and contains 20 characters. This was the first seal that could be confidently attributed to the a
Western Liao period as it is attributed to have been created during the 3rd month of the year Tianxi 20 (or the year 1197 in the Gregorian calendar) during the reign of Emperor Yelü Zhilugu. The discovery of this seal further indicated that the Qara Khitai Khanate adopted the Chinese administrative practice, as such seals were commonly used in the Imperial Chinese government apparatus. 

As of 2020 it is unclear if the same regulations on seals existed in Qara Khitai as did in imperial China and if the sizes of Western Liao seals were standardised or not.

Sovereigns of Qara Khitai

See also 

 History of the Khitans
 Liao dynasty
 Northern Liao
 Eastern Liao
 Later Liao
 Qutlugh-Khanids
 Buraq Hajib
 Kara-Khanid Khanate
 Proto-Mongols
 History of the central steppe

Notes

References

Citations

Sources 

 
 
 
 

 
Dynasties in Chinese history
Former countries in Chinese history
History of Mongolia
12th century in Asia
13th century in Asia
12th century in China
13th century in China
1120s establishments in Asia
1218 disestablishments in Asia
States and territories established in 1124
States and territories disestablished in 1218
Persian-speaking countries and territories
Former empires